Flurzwang is the German term for the obligation to participate in open field cultivation in Europe in former times. The owners of farmland and the lord of the manor ordered the cultivation of individual pieces of agricultural land in the community in areas using the three year crop rotation system, which was used between the late Middle Ages until about the middle of the 19th century, or even much longer in some places. It typically resulted in dispersal of the ownership of property over the entire land of the community, the so-called Gemengelage (mixed location).

Objective
The aim was to prevent a farmer or property owner from gaining an advantage by harvesting earlier or cultivating other produce from what had previously been agreed upon. The agreements were also supposed to prevent damages to the land due to people walking or even driving onto the fields. In addition, they were to prevent theft of vegetables or other produce. As part of Flurzwang, land owners had to relinquish part of their land for pathways when the land was developed. Fenced fields were exempted from Flurzwang and special crops could also be grown on them. This was the case for wine growing, for instance. The owner of such a field had to pay compensation to the other farmers.

Obligations
Each farmer had to obey the agreed upon sequence for the crops in the crop rotation system and also the agreed upon times for the work (plowing, sowing and harvesting). Otherwise, it would have been necessary for a farmer to drive his wagon over neighboring fields to reach his own fields. No one could disobey these rules. The chairman of a farmers cooperative or of a village who was in charge of the Flurzwang was called Schulze.

End of Flurzwang
Flurzwang became questionable for the landowners affected after the introduction of clover farming and later potato and beet farming. It was finally abolished during the liberation of the farmers, which happened in Germany, Switzerland and Austria as a result of the French Revolution from approximately 1803 to 1850.

History of agriculture